Paper Wars is a quarterly wargaming magazine. The publisher is Compass Games.

History and profile
The magazine began life as Wargame Collector's Journal in September/October, 1991 and acquired its current title beginning with issue number nine in March, 1993. The magazine was published by Omega Games, a producer of military simulation board games, card games for business education, and general-interest card games, until September 2012. The magazine includes a game in every issue. The magazine's editor is Ty Bomba and the headquarters is in Cromwell, CT. 

A CD-ROM containing the first 26 issues in pdf format was released in 2005. Since being taken over by Compass Games, the magazine features a complete wargame in each issue.  It also features reviews of new games, discussions of books of interest to wargamers, and industry news and advertisements.

See also
Ranger (board game)

References

External links
Compass Games website

Quarterly magazines published in the United States
Magazines established in 1991
Wargaming magazines
Hobby magazines published in the United States
Magazines published in Connecticut